The 2018 KNSB Dutch Allround Championships in speed skating were held in Heerenveen at the Thialf ice skating rink from 27 January to 28 January 2018. The tournament was part of the 2017–2018 speed skating season. Marcel Bosker and Annouk van der Weijden won the allround titles.

Schedule

Medalists

Allround

Distance

Classification

Men's allround

Women's allround

Source:

References

KNSB Dutch Allround Championships
KNSB Dutch Allround Championships
2018 Allround
KNSB Dutch Allround Championships, 2018
January 2018 sports events in the Netherlands
2010s in Amsterdam